Sherell Ford (born August 26, 1972) is an American former professional basketball player. A 6'7" forward from the University of Illinois at Chicago, Ford was selected by the Seattle SuperSonics in the first round (26th overall) of the 1995 NBA Draft and signed a three-year $1.67 million contract. However, Ford played only one NBA season before being released by the team. In his brief NBA career, he played in 28 games and scored a total of 90 points. His final NBA game was played on April 21, 1996, in a 99–88 loss to the Denver Nuggets where he played for 3 minutes and his only stat was 1 steal.

While at Proviso East High School in Maywood, Illinois, Ford was teammate of fellow NBA players Michael Finley and Donnie Boyce.  While at UIC, Ford finished in the top three in points per game (1st), rebounds per game (1st), blocks per game (2nd) and steals per game (3rd) in the Mid-Continent Conference (now known as Summit League) during his sophomore season.  The following year, he averaged over 26 points per game, good for fourth in the nation, and secured Midwestern Collegiate Conference (now known as Horizon League) player of the year before entering the NBA draft.

References

External links
NBA stats at basketballreference.com

1972 births
Living people
African-American basketball players
American expatriate basketball people in Argentina
American expatriate basketball people in Chile
American expatriate basketball people in Greece
American expatriate basketball people in Israel
American expatriate basketball people in Lebanon
American expatriate basketball people in Poland
American expatriate basketball people in Russia
American expatriate basketball people in Turkey
American men's basketball players
Basketball players from Baton Rouge, Louisiana
Grand Rapids Hoops players
Harlem Globetrotters players
Israeli Basketball Premier League players
La Crosse Bobcats players
Power forwards (basketball)
Seattle SuperSonics draft picks
Seattle SuperSonics players
UIC Flames men's basketball players
Yakima Sun Kings players
American expatriate basketball people in the Philippines
Philippine Basketball Association imports
Pop Cola Panthers players
Sagesse SC basketball players
21st-century African-American sportspeople
20th-century African-American sportspeople